Hamad Ganayem (born 8 July 1987) is an Arab-Israeli professional football (soccer) player who plays for Hapoel Arraba.

References

Footnotes

1987 births
Living people
Arab citizens of Israel
Arab-Israeli footballers
Israeli footballers
Association football midfielders
Bnei Sakhnin F.C. players
Shabab Al-Khalil SC players
Hapoel Iksal F.C. players
Hapoel Kaukab F.C. players
F.C. Daburiyya players
Maccabi Ironi Tamra F.C. players
Maccabiah Games medalists in football
Maccabiah Games gold medalists for Israel
Israeli Premier League players
Liga Leumit players
West Bank Premier League players
Footballers from Sakhnin